Kålaboda River (Swedish: Kålabodaån) is a river in Sweden.

References

Västerbotten
Rivers of Västerbotten County